Tap Tap or Tap Tap Revenge was a series of rhythm games by Tapulous available for the iOS of which several versions, both purchasable and free, have been produced. The goal of the game is to tap each of the colored balls when they reach a line at the bottom of the screen. If the ball is hit on the beat, the player gains points, but if not, it counts as a miss. If a player taps the screen without a tapper on the beat, the streak will go back to 0 and a few points will be lost except for 16x. There were also "shakes", which required the player to move the iPhone, iPod Touch or iPad to the right, left, or backwards. The apps were pulled from the app store and had their servers shut down in February 2014.

Games
There were 23 games in the Tap Tap series of games, 18 which are artist-specific.

Tap Tap Revenge

Tap Tap Revenge 2

On March 3, 2009, Tap Tap Revenge 2 was released.  Tap Tap Revenge became the most-downloaded free application on the App Store only three days after its release, and reached half a million downloads over that period.

Nine Inch Nails Revenge
In October 2008, Tapulous announced that they were working on a premium Nine Inch Nails-branded version of Tap Tap Revenge, including a special Nine Inch Nails skin and 16 songs from the band's albums Ghosts I–IV and The Slip, some of which would be specially edited for the game.

Tap Tap Dance
Tap Tap Dance was released in December 2008, featuring electronic music from artists such as Daft Punk, Justice, Digitalism, and The Chemical Brothers. It was first to feature the rewritten OpenGL-based game engine that powered all subsequent games in the series, and introduced features such as special boss tracks for certain songs with custom visuals, along with core features like tap and hold notes. It was well-received critically, winning IGN's Best Music Game of 2008.

Lady Gaga Revenge
Lady Gaga Revenge featured 14 tracks by Lady Gaga including 4 remixes of her songs. It was launched on June 9, 2009. In an interview with USA Today, Gaga mentioned, "my record label might kill me for saying this, but you are essentially purchasing my album for $4.99 and you are also getting a game. So you are getting way more bang for your buck."

References

IOS games
Android (operating system) games
Disney Interactive franchises
Rhythm games
Video game franchises introduced in 2008